Franca Ronchese is an Italian-New Zealand immunologist. She currently leads the immune cell biology programme at the Malaghan Institute of Medical Research in Wellington, New Zealand and is a research professor at Victoria University of Wellington.

Career
After a PhD at the University of Padua, Italy, Ronchese worked as a postdoctoral fellow in the laboratory of Ronald Germain at the National Institutes of Health in the United States. After her postdoctoral studies, she joined the Basel Institute for Immunology, Switzerland, where she became interested in antigen presentation by dendritic cells in vivo. In 1994, Ronchese moved to New Zealand to establish her research programme at the Malaghan Institute of Medical Research, with a focus on developing immune therapies for cancer and allergies. Her current research focuses on dendritic cells (a kind of immune cell), and includes allergic response work.

In 2012, Ronchese was a finalist in the NEXT Woman of the Year. In 2018, she was invited to give the Australian and New Zealand Society for Immunology's Burnet Oration.

Personal life 
Ronchese is married to Graham Le Gros, research director of the Malaghan Institute.

Selected publications

References

External links
 
 
 institutional homepage

Living people
Year of birth missing (living people)
Academic staff of the Victoria University of Wellington
New Zealand women academics
New Zealand immunologists
Italian emigrants to New Zealand
Italian expatriates in Switzerland
University of Padua alumni